Cyperus chermezonianus is a species of sedge that is native to parts of Africa.

See also 
 List of Cyperus species

References 

chermezonianus
Plants described in 1955
Flora of Cameroon
Flora of Tanzania
Flora of the Republic of the Congo